Rajani may refer to:

Rajani (name), people named Rajani
Rajani (actress) (born 1965), Indian film actress
Rajani (TV series), a 1980s Indian TV series
Rajani (film), a 2009 Indian Kannada romantic comedy 
 Rajani, an 1877 novel by Bankimchandra Chattopadhyay

See also
Rajini (disambiguation)